Influenza virus nucleoprotein (NP) is a structural protein which encapsidates the negative strand viral RNA. NP is one of the main determinants of species specificity. The question of how far the NP gene can cross the species barrier by reassortment and become adapted by mutation to the new host has been discussed.

References

Structural proteins
Influenza